Sam Obi Metzger, Jr. (born 19 September 1987 in Freetown) is a Sierra Leonean footballer who plays as an attacking midfielder for Finnish second division side FC Haka.

Career

International 
He played at the 2003 FIFA U-17 World Championship in Finland. Sierra Leone lost two of the three games at the tournament, including a 2–1 loss to the United States team. Metzger played in all three games and was again the top scorer for Sierra Leone with two goals.
Metzger made his senior international debut for Sierra Leone on September 6, 2008, as a substitute replacing Mustapha Bangura in a 2010 FIFA World Cup and 2008 African Nations Cup qualifier as Sierra Leone defeated Guinea Bissau 2–0 in Freetown. He has also played 2nd division in Slovakia for MFK TOPVAR TOPOLCANY which he joined for the second half of the 2009 season.

On 1 February 2011, Leone Stars striker Obi Metzger Jr. has joined Finnish premier league side,  FC Haka on a two-year deal.

Personal life 
Metzger was born in Freetown to Krio parents. He is the son of Obi Metzger, Sr., who is a former Sierra Leonean international footballer and former coach of the Sierra Leone national football team.

External links
 Atlantis Profile
 FC Viikingit Profile
 
 
 FC Haka Profile

References

1987 births
Living people
Sierra Leone Creole people
Sierra Leonean footballers
Sportspeople from Freetown
Mighty Blackpool players
FC Viikingit players
FC Haka players
Atlantis FC players
Sierra Leonean expatriate footballers
Expatriate footballers in Finland
Ports Authority F.C. players
Association football forwards
Association football midfielders
Sierra Leone international footballers